Artistry is significant artistic skill.

Artistry may also refer to:

 Artistry (cosmetics), a brand of cosmetics
 Artistry Music, a record label
 Artistry, a 1974 album by Eumir Deodato
 Artistry, a 1992 album by Martin Taylor (guitarist)